Orinduik is a diamond-mining community in the Potaro-Siparuni region of Guyana near the border with Brazil.

The diamond production has seen a steep decrease in the 21st century. Orinduik has a population of 3 people as of 2012.

Orinduik Falls is a popular tourist attraction. Orinduik Airport provides access to the area. It has a police station.

References

Populated places in Potaro-Siparuni

Populated places in Guyana